Carlos Moyá was the defending champion but lost in the final 6–4, 6–1 against Guillermo Coria.

Seeds

  Guillermo Coria (champion)
  Carlos Moyá (final)
  Nicolás Massú (quarterfinals)
  Gustavo Kuerten (first round)
  Agustín Calleri (second round)
  Mariano Zabaleta (quarterfinals)
  Gastón Gaudio (first round)
  Juan Ignacio Chela (second round)

Draw

Finals

Top half

Bottom half

External links
 2004 ATP Buenos Aires Main Draw
 Main Draw
 Qualifying Draw

ATP Buenos Aires
2004 ATP Tour
ATP